San Paolino (Italian language) usually refers to St. Paulinus of Nola

San Paolino may also refer to:
 Church of San Paolino, Florence
 Church of San Paolino, Lucca
 Mountain of San Paolino, Sutera, Sicily
 Barons di San Paolino, a Maltese noble house